The Winthrop Eagles baseball team is a varsity intercollegiate athletic team of Winthrop University in Rock Hill, South Carolina, United States. The team is a member of the Big South Conference, which is part of the National Collegiate Athletic Association's Division I. The team plays its home games at Winthrop Ballpark in Rock Hill, South Carolina. The Eagles are coached by Tom Riginos.

Major League Baseball 
Winthrop has had 34 Major League Baseball Draft selections since the draft began in 1965.

See also
 List of NCAA Division I baseball programs

References

External links